North Street in the North End of Boston, Massachusetts extends from Congress Street to Commercial Street. It runs past Dock Square, Faneuil Hall, Quincy Market, the Rose Kennedy Greenway, and North Square. It was first named in 1852, and consists of segments of streets formerly named Ann, Fish, Ship, Drawbridge, and Conduit Streets.

Ann Street in the 19th century

Ann Street, also known as the "Black Sea", was an infamous neighborhood in the 19th century. The main street and its side alleys formed a red-light district where brothels, inns, "jilt shops", and taverns could be segregated from the rest of the city. Over half of Boston's brothels were located there.

The establishments in the area relied heavily on custom from sailors, who had come ashore at Dock Square nearby, and working men, who used the taverns as meeting places in the winter. The area was one of the few places in Boston where African Americans and whites intermingled.

Ann Street was the main thoroughfare through the neighborhood. It ran from Faneuil Market, spanned an old drawbridge, and led into the rest of the Boston's North End, terminating at the wharves. On 4 December 1834, Ann Street was widened to connect Merchant's Row and Blackstone Street. The area lay about ten minutes by foot from Boston's banking and commercial center.

Police raids 
The Ann Street area was occasionally subject to police raids, generally superficial affairs that left the brothels alone. In 1851 Ann Street had reached the height of its notoriety. Police who patrolled the area (now known as the "Black Sea") estimated that it was home to 227 brothels, 26 gambling dens, and 1,500 establishments that sold liquor.

The Boston government responded by organizing a raid. The first, on 8 March 1851, nabbed 86 gamblers. A second on 14 March took many more. Officer Edward H. Savage described the final phase of this Great Descent: "On the eve of the 23rd of April, this year, we made the great Police descent in Ann Street, capturing some one hundred and sixty bipeds, who were punished for piping, fiddling, dancing, drinking, and attending crimes." This raid involved some 50 officers (the whole day force's contingent) and 50 night officers. In all, 60 men, including 35 brothel keepers, and 95 women, mostly prostitutes, were arrested.

Name change: North Street 
At the behest of residents eager to improve the area's image, Boston rechristened Ann Street "North Street" in 1852. The change made little difference. In 1866, some Protestant missionaries described the area as "squealing of fiddles" and the "disorderly shuffle of many feet", populated by criminals of every kind.

In 1896, Benjamin Orange Flower described a similar scene in his book Civilization's Inferno. Over time, the area did improve, but this was more likely the result of economic and community changes.

Present day 
Today's North Street is part of a rejuvenated North End and all of Boston's red-light district is limited to a few bookstores and two strip clubs on Kneeland Street, part of the now defunct "Combat Zone".

See also
 Dock Square (Boston, Massachusetts)
 Market Museum (Boston)
 North Square (Boston, Massachusetts)
 Old Feather Store

Image gallery

References

Further reading
 Bergen, Philip. Old Boston in Early Photographs, 1850-1918: 174 Prints from the Collection of the Boston Society. Dover Publications.
 Duis, Perry R. (1999). The Saloon: Public Drinking in Chicago and Boston, 1880-1920. University of Illinois Press.
 Hobson, Barbara Meil (1987). Uneasy Virtue: The Politics of Prostitution and the American Reform Tradition. Chicago University Press.
 Savage, Edward H. (1865). A Chronological History of the Boston Watch and Police, from 1631 to 1865: Together with Recollections of a Boston Police Officer, or Boston by Daylight and Gaslight.: From the Diary of an Officer Fifteen Years in the Service. Boston.

External links

 Bostonian Society has materials related to the street.
 Google news archive. Articles related to North Street
 https://www.flickr.com/photos/mit-libraries/3423279419/
 https://www.flickr.com/photos/krobb/3537151666/
 https://www.flickr.com/photos/gigharmon/3023067772/
 https://www.flickr.com/photos/manzari/179287240/

Streets in Boston
North End, Boston
History of Boston
Sex industry in Massachusetts
Historical red-light districts in the United States